"I Should've Known" is a song by American singer-songwriter Aimee Mann, which was released in 1993 as the lead single from her debut studio album Whatever. The song was written by Mann and produced by Jon Brion. "I Should've Known" reached No. 55 in the UK Singles Chart and No. 16 in the US Billboard Modern Rock Tracks chart. In 1994, the single was reissued in the UK and Europe, and peaked at No. 45 in the UK Singles Chart.

Background
In the United States, "I Should've Known" received airplay on alternative radio, but failed to generate considerable sales. It saw more commercial success in the United Kingdom after being played frequently on BBC Radio. Mann told The Boston Globe in 1993: "When I asked Jonathan Russell [a BBC staffer] why the BBC wanted to play it, he said, 'Just because it's a good song.' Hey, I didn't think that happened anymore."

Music video
The song's music video was shot in and around a vacant house near Ithaca, New York in March 1993. It was directed by Katherine Dieckmann and produced by Sandra Tait for Cascando Studios. Dickermann and Mann had originally intended for the video to be shot "down south" with a "spring feeling" but owing to the 1993 Storm of the Century, which resulted in heavy snowfall, it was filmed near Ithaca instead.

Dieckmann told Billboard in 1993: "It's unusual to see a woman in a video who isn't portrayed as a bimbo or as some 'tough chick'. Aimee wanted to break out of the whole 'Til Tuesday image of the heartbroken, lovesick girl raging about relationships. So we decided to treat this breakup with some black humor."

Critical reception
In a review of Whatever, Mark Caro of the Chicago Tribune described "I Should've Known" as the best of the album's "upbeat songs" and a "crunching guitar stomp freshened by a breeze of background vocals." Chuck Campbell of the Scripps Howard News Service considered it a "liberating song" which is "so well crafted with its thoroughly ingratiating hook, sumptuous backing vocals and intriguing decorations that listeners will be hard pressed to let the album advance to the second track".

Parry Gettelman of The Orlando Sentinel wrote: "'I Should've Known' sounds like Sgt. Pepper-era Beatles via World Party and Crowded House. There's a bit of the Kinks via Chrissie Hynde in Mann's vocal, and the coda is shot through with the riff from George Harrison's 'Something' kinda sideways and upside down." Sam Gnerre of The News-Pilot noted: "Mann breathes life into the often-complex songs with her warm, conversational vocal style, which gives mid-tempo songs such as "I Should've Known" a resonant fullness."

Track listing

1993 release
7" single (UK release)
"I Should've Known" (Edit) – 4:00
"Jimmy Hoffa Jokes" – 2:29

CD single (European release)
"I Should've Known" (Edit) – 4:00
"Jimmy Hoffa Jokes" – 2:29
"Jacob Marley's Chain" – 3:02

CD single (US release)
"I Should've Known" – 4:53
"Take It Back" – 2:52
"Baby Blue" – 3:50

CD single (US promo)
"I Should've Known" (Edit) – 4:00
"I Should've Known" (Edit) – 4:11
"I Should've Known" (LP Version) – 4:53

1994 re-issue
7" and cassette single
"I Should've Known" (Edit) – 4:00
"Truth On My Side" (Demo Version) – 4:20

10" single
"I Should've Known" (Live) – 4:04
"4th July" (Live) – 3:15
"Stupid Thing" (Live) – 4:29
"The Other End (Of the Telescope)" (Live) – 4:13

CD single
"I Should've Known" (Edit) – 4:00
"Fifty Years After the Fair" (Demo Version) – 4:01
"Truth On My Side" (Demo Version) – 4:20
"Put On Some Speed" (Demo Version) – 4:01

Personnel
I Should've Known
 Aimee Mann – vocals, electric guitar, bass, dixie cup
 Jon Brion – electric guitar, pump organ, mellotron, chamberlin, bass, drums, vocals
 Todd Nelson – intro guitar
 Buddy Judge – vocals

Production
 Jon Brion – producer of "I Should've Known", "Take It Back", "Baby Blue", "Jimmy Hoffa Jokes" and "Jacob Marley's Chain"
 Bob Clearmountain – mixing on "I Should've Known", "Take It Back", "Baby Blue", "Jimmy Hoffa Jokes" and "Jacob Marley's Chain"
 Michael Reiter – assistant mixer on "I Should've Known"
 Bob Ludwig – mastering

Other
 Anton Corbijn – photography
 Anonymous Design – 1994 reissue sleeve design

Charts

References

1993 songs
1993 singles
1994 singles
Aimee Mann songs
Songs written by Aimee Mann
Songs written by Jon Brion
Song recordings produced by Jon Brion
Imago Records singles